Surry Hills is an inner-east suburb of Sydney, in the state of New South Wales, Australia. Surry Hills is immediately south-east of the Sydney central business district in the local government area of the City of Sydney. Surry Hills is surrounded by the suburbs of Darlinghurst to the north, Chippendale and Haymarket to the west, Moore Park and Paddington to the east and Redfern to the south.  It is often colloquially referred to as "Surry".

It is bordered by Elizabeth Street and Chalmers Street to the west, Cleveland Street to the south, South Dowling Street to the east, and Oxford Street to the north. Crown Street is a main thoroughfare through the suburb with numerous restaurants, pubs and bars. Central is a locality in the north-west of the suburb around Central station. Prince Alfred Park is located nearby. Strawberry Hills is a locality around Cleveland and Elizabeth Streets and Brickfield Hill to the east of that.

A multicultural suburb, Surry Hills has had a long association with the Portuguese community of Sydney.

History 
The first land grants in Surry Hills were made in the 1790s. Major Joseph Foveaux received .  His property was known as Surry Hills Farm, after the Surrey Hills in Surrey, England.  Foveaux Street is named in his honour. Commissary John Palmer received . He called the property George Farm and in 1800 Palmer also bought Foveaux's farm. In 1792, the boundaries of the Sydney Cove settlement were established between the head of Cockle Bay to the head of Woolloomooloo Bay.  West of the boundary, which included present-day Surry Hills, was considered suitable for farming and was granted to military officers and free settlers.

After Palmer's political failures, his reduced financial circumstances forced the first subdivision and sale of his estate in 1814. Due to the hilly terrain, much of the suburb was considered remote and 'inhospitable'. In the early years of the nineteenth century the area around what is now Prince Alfred Park was undeveloped land known as the Government Paddocks or Cleveland Paddocks. A few villas were built in the suburb in the late 1820s. The suburb remained one of contrasts for much of the nineteenth century, with the homes of wealthy merchants mixed with that of the commercial and working classes.

In 1820, Governor Macquarie ordered the consecration of the Devonshire Street Cemetery. A brick wall was erected before any interments took place to enclose its . A road was formed along the southern boundary of the cemetery in the first half of the 1830s and was called Devonshire Street. The Devonshire Street Cemetery, where many of the early settlers were buried, was later moved to build the Sydney railway terminus. Central railway station was opened on 4 August 1906. The area around Cleveland and Elizabeth streets was known as Strawberry Hills. Strawberry Hills post office was located at this intersection for many years.

In 1833, the Nichols estate was subdivided and sold. One purchase was by Thomas Broughton and subsequently acquired by George Hill who constructed Durham Hall on this and adjoining lots. Terrace houses and workers' cottages were built in Surry Hills from the 1850s. Light industry became established in the area, particularly in the rag trade (clothing industry). It became a working class suburb, predominately inhabited by Irish immigrants. The suburb developed a reputation for crime and vice. The Sydney underworld figure Kate Leigh (1881–1964), lived in Surry Hills for more than 80 years.

In 1896 Patineur Grotesque one of Australia's first films and first comedy routine filmed was shot in Prince Alfred Park by Marius Sestier.

Surry Hills was favoured by newly arrived families after World War II when property values were low and accommodation was inexpensive. From the 1980s, the area was gentrified, with many of the area's older houses and building restored and many new upper middle-class residents enjoying the benefits of inner-city living. The suburb is now a haven for the upper middle class and young rich.

Trams 

The West Kensington via Surry Hills Line operated from 1881 down Crown Street as far as Cleveland Street as a steam tramway. It was extended to Phillip Street in 1909, Todman Avenue in 1912, and then to its final terminus down Todman Avenue in 1937. When the line was fully operational it branched from the tramlines in Oxford Street and proceeded down Crown Street to Cleveland Street in Surry Hills, then south along Baptist Street to Phillip Street, where it swung left into Crescent Street before running south along Dowling Street. It passed the Dowling Street Depot, then turned left into Todman Avenue, where it terminated at West Kensington. The line along Crown Street closed in 1957, the remainder stayed open until 1961 to allow access to Dowling Street Tram Depot. Transdev John Holland routes 301, 302 and 303 generally follow the route down Crown and Baptist Streets as far as Phillip Street.

Urban character 

Surry Hills has a mixture of residential, commercial and light industrial areas. It remains Sydney's main centre for fashion wholesale activities, particularly on the western side. The area is also home to a large LGBTQIA+ community, where Sydney's Gay and Lesbian Mardi Gras (Pride Parade) takes place each year.

Surry Hills Markets are held in Shannon Reserve at the corner of Crown and Collins Streets, on the first Saturday of every month, and the Surry Hills Festival is an annual community event, attracting tens of thousands of visitors, held in and around Ward Park, Shannon Reserve, Crown Street and Hill Street.
The Surry Hills Library and Community Centre sits opposite Shannon Reserve and houses the local branch of the city library and the Surry Hills Neighbourhood Centre.

In popular culture

Literature 
The Harp in the South is a novel by Ruth Park. Published in 1948, it portrays the life of a Catholic Irish-Australian family in Surry Hills, which was an inner city slum at the time. A sequel, Poor Man's Orange, was published in 1949.

Transport 

Central railway station, the largest station on the Sydney Trains and NSW TrainLink networks, sits on the western edge of Surry Hills. Surry Hills is also serviced by Transdev John Holland and Transit Systems buses. The Eastern Distributor is a major road, on the eastern edge of the suburb. Major thoroughfares are Crown Street, Cleveland Street, Bourke Street and Foveaux Street. Surry Hills is within easy walking distance of the Sydney CBD, and is included in a widening network of cycleways.

Major construction took place on the Surry Hills section of the CBD and South East Light Rail which opened in December 2019 and April 2020 respectively. Transport for NSW managed this project. It has been reported that there has been some disruption to local businesses because of the construction work taking place.

Places of worship 

 Chinese Presbyterian Church
 Christian Israelite Church
 Cityside Church (Australian Christian Churches)
 Dawn of Islam Mosque
 Holy Trinity Greek Orthodox Church
 King Faisal Mosque
 Self-Realization Fellowship Sydney Centre
 Society of Friends
 St Frances De Sales Catholic Church
 St Michael's Anglican Church
 St Peters Catholic Church
 Surry Hills Baptist Church
 Sydney Streetlevel Mission (The Salvation Army)
 Vine Church

Landmarks 

 Sydney Police Centre 
 Centennial Plaza
 Belvoir Street Theatre
 Prince Alfred Park & Swimming Pool
 Tom Mann Theatre
 Harmony Park
 Ward Park, Devonshire Street
 Rainbow Crossing, Taylor Square
 Surry Hills Library and Community Centre, Crown Street
 The Kirk, Cleveland Street

Restaurants 
Surry Hills boasts a diverse range of cafes and restaurants serving a wide variety of cooking styles and cultures. The suburb has one of the highest, if not the highest, concentration of restaurants in Sydney. Local chefs include Andrew Cibej and Bill Granger.

Pubs and bars 
Because of its industrial and commercial history, the Surry Hills area contains a significant number of pubs. The style of pubs range from the Victorian period to Federation and Art Deco pubs from the mid-1900s. Many of these have been refurbished in recent years to include restaurants and modern facilities.
|}

Heritage buildings 
Surry Hills has a number of heritage-listed sites, including the following sites listed on the New South Wales State Heritage Register:
 197, 199, 201 Albion Street: 197, 199, 201 Albion Street terrace cottages
 203-205 Albion Street: 203-205 Albion Street cottages
 207 Albion Street: Durham Hall
 626-630 Bourke Street: Holy Trinity Greek Orthodox Church, Surry Hills
 Centennial Park to College Street: Busby's Bore
 Chalmers Street: Railway Institute Building
 146-164 Chalmers Street: Cleveland House, Surry Hills
 356 Crown Street: Crown Street Public School
 285 Crown Street: Crown Street Reservoir
 397 Crown Street: 1849 Stonemasonry workshop
 416 Bourke Street: Hopetoun Hotel

The following buildings are listed on the now defunct Register of the National Estate:

 Bourke Street Public School, established in 1880 and located in heritage-listed buildings
 Children's Court, Albion Street
 Former Police Station, 703 Bourke Street (designed by Walter Liberty Vernon)
 Former Wesleyan Chapel, 348A Bourke Street
 Riley Street Infants School, 378-386 Riley Street
 Society of Friends Meeting House, Devonshire Street
 St David's Hall, Arthur Street
 St Michael's Anglican Church, hall and rectory, Albion Street

Housing 

Surry Hills is largely composed of grand Victorian terraced houses and some complexes of public housing units to the west of Riley Street. Examples of converted buildings previously used as hospitals include Crown Street Hospital and St. Margaret's, in addition to other building conversions.

Schools 

Bourke Street Public School, Crown Street Public School, Sydney Community College, Sydney Boys High School and Sydney Girls High School are notable examples. The Australian Institute of Music's Sydney Campus is also located in Surry Hills.

Population 
Demographically, Surry Hills is now characterised as a mixture of wealthy newcomers who have gentrified the suburb, and long-time residents. 

According to the 2021 census the population of Surry Hills was 15,828.

Only 0.4% of dwellings are separate houses, compared to the Australian average of 75.6%. Surry Hills is categorised as a high wealth area, with a median weekly household income of $2,144, compared to the Australian average of $1,438. 
Historically, the suburb had an influx of post-war immigrants from Europe, particularly those from Greece, Portugal and Italy.

The most common foreign countries of birth were England 6.4%, Thailand 3.9%, China (excludes SARs and Taiwan) 3.6%, New Zealand 3.2% and the United States of America 1.9%. 47.6% of dwellings have no cars, compared to the Australian average of 7.5%. 32.9% of the population walked to work, compared to the Australian average of 3.7%, and 30.2% travelled to work by public transport, compared to the Australian average of 10.4%.

In 2016 Surry Hills was a significantly more irreligious suburb than the Australian average. A plurality (44.0%) reported no religion whilst 16.9% did not answer the question. The most common religions reported were Catholic 15.6%, Buddhism 6.4% and Anglican 5.6%.

Notable people 
 Tilly Devine (1900–1970), a prominent English-born crime syndicate figure and madam
 Jimmy Hannan (1937–2019), radio and television host 
 Kate Leigh (1881–1964), (resided) a figure in the notorious Sydney razor gang wars
 Jessica Mauboy, (born 1989) singer and actress
 Ruth Park, (1917–2010), author, resided for a time in Surry Hills, where her first book, The Harp in the South (1948), was set
 Kenneth Slessor  (1901–1972), poet and author, many of whose poems were set in Surry Hills, Darlinghurst and Kings Cross
 Catherine Sutherland, (born 1974) actress
 Brett Whiteley  (1939–1992), artist who resided and had a studio in Surry Hills, now the Brett Whiteley Studio

Gallery

References

External links 

  [CC-By-SA]
  [CC-By-SA]
 demographics

Further reading 

 
Suburbs of Sydney
Slums in Australia
Portuguese-Australian culture